Bagata people are one of the tribal ethnic groups of India, mainly concentrated in Andhrapradesh and Odisha. As per the Indian constitution, they are designated as Scheduled Tribe for affirmative action.

Population distribution 
The Bagatas, are generally scattered in all districts of Odisha, Telangana, Andhrapradesh but are mainly concerned in Vishakapatnam, Vizianagaram, East Godavari, Rangareddy district of Andhra Pradesh (including Telangana); Sundargarh, Mayurbhanj, Sambalpur, Baleshwar district of Odisha.

Overview 
Bagata is traditionally a Telugu ethnic fishermen tribe. They're alternatively written as Bhakta, Bhogata and Bhagata and in Andhrapradesh their local name is Kampu/ Kapu. In Andhrapradesh they use a dialect of the Telugu language, Desia Odia and in Odisha, they left Telugu and speak the regional language like Hindi, Odia, Sadri, Laria, and Kurmali. Bagata people bear biological traits of Proto-Australoid tribes of the south and center India.

Social structure 
The Bagatas of Andhrapradesh retain the original socio-cultural characteristics, whereas the Bagatas of  Odisha undergone various socio-cultural purification process and are largely Hinduised. The Bagatas of Odisha are broadly divided into two divisions i.e. Vaishnavites and Saivites according to their beliefs.

The Bagata of Vaishnavas section is divided into totemic clans like Belhar (monkey), Samudia, Bamia, Tiruar (bird), Sarania (flute), Nag, Hatiar (elephant), Chumiar and Kuardar. They use their clan as a surname. However, some authors opined that there was no surname or subgroup system in them but after migration, they adopted those and now almost use surnames like other Hindu societies. Historically, they migrated to the Ranchi region of Chota Nagpur from Andhrapradesh before the 20th century and subsequently migrated to the northern district of Odisha.

In 1976 the Bagata had the highest rate of indebtedness of any of the scheduled tribes of Andhra Pradesh.

References

Further reading
 
 
 
 
 
 

Scheduled Tribes of Andhra Pradesh
Scheduled Tribes of Odisha